Afsana (افسانه) is a Persian word for "tale" or "fable." It is also a name used in many countries across Asia, most commonly in Afghanistan.

Etymology
From Persian افسانه‎ (afsâne).
Tale, story, fable, legend, myth.

Descendants
→ Azerbaijani: əfsanə
→ Hindustani:
Hindi: अफ़साना (afsānā)
Urdu: افسانہ‎ (afsānā)
→ Kazakh: әпсана (äpsana)
→ Ottoman Turkish: افسانه‎ (efsane)
Turkish: efsane
→ Uzbek: afsona

Similar Muslim Name

♂Afsa

♂Afsah

♂Afsaneh

♂Afsar

♂Afsar ud din

♂Afsaruddin

♂Afshin

♀Afa

♀Afsana

♀Afsar

♀Afshan

♀Afsheen

♀Afshin

♀Afshana

♀Apsana

♀Afsheena.

References

Feminine given names